The Preseli Hills, known locally and historically as the Preseli Mountains ( or ), is a range of hills in western Wales, mostly within the Pembrokeshire Coast National Park.

The ancient  of track along the top of the range is known as the Golden Road.

The Preselis have a diverse ecosystem, many prehistoric sites, and are a popular tourist destination. There are scattered settlements and small villages; the uplands provide extensive unenclosed grazing, and the lower slopes are mainly enclosed pasture.

Slate quarrying was once an important industry. More recently, igneous rock is being extracted. The Preselis have Special Area of Conservation status, and there are three sites of special scientific interest (SSSIs).

Name variations
A peak is spelt Percelye on a 1578 parish map, and more recent maps show the range as Presely or Mynydd Prescelly. The etymology is unknown, but is likely to involve Welsh prys, meaning "wood, bush, copse". A number of other peaks are shown on the 1578 map, but the only other named peak is Wrennyvaur (now Frenni Fawr). An 1819 Ordnance Survey Map refers to the range as Precelly Mountain (singular). An 1833 publication stated: the ancient Welsh name...is Preswylva, signifying "a place of residence", but does not cite any evidence.

Geology

The hills are formed largely from the Ordovician age marine mudstones and siltstones of the Penmaen Dewi Shales and Aber Mawr Shale formations which have been intruded by microgabbro (otherwise known as dolerite or diabase) of Ordovician age. The former slate quarries at Rosebush on the southern edge of the hills worked the Aber Mawr Formation rocks whilst it is the dolerite tors of Carnmenyn which have been postulated, amongst other localities, as the source of the Stonehenge ‘bluestones’.

In contrast Foel Drygarn towards the eastern end of the range is formed from tuffs and lavas of the Fishguard Volcanic Group. Further east is Frenni Fawr which is formed from mudstones and sandstones of the Nantmel Mudstone Formation of late Ordovician Ashgill age. The sedimentary rocks dip generally northwards and are cut by numerous geological faults.
Cwm Gwaun is a major glacial meltwater channel which divides the northern tops such as Mynydd Carningli from the main mass of the hills.

Geography
The hills, much of which are unenclosed moorland or low-grade grazing with areas of bog, are surrounded by farmland and active or deserted farms. Field boundaries tend to be earth banks topped with fencing and stock-resistant plants such as gorse. Rosebush Reservoir, one of only two reservoirs in Pembrokeshire, supplies water to southern Pembrokeshire and is a brown trout fishery located on the southern slopes of the range near the village of Rosebush. To the south is Llys y Fran reservoir. There are no natural lakes in the hills, but a number of rivers, including the Gwaun, Nevern, Syfynwy and Tâf have their sources in the range.

Peaks

Settlements
Villages and other settlements within the range include Blaenffos, Brynberian, Crosswell, Crymych, Cwm Gwaun, Dinas Cross, Glandy Cross, Mynachlog-ddu, New Inn, Pentre Galar, Puncheston, Maenclochog, Rosebush and Tafarn-y-Bwlch. The only town in the Preseli area is Newport, at the foot of the Carningli-Dinas upland in the northwest of the range.

Natural history and land use
The Preselis provide hill grazing for much of the year and there is some forestry. As well as features of interest to geologists and archaeologists, the hills have a wide variety of bird, insect and plant life.  There are three sites of special scientific interest (SSSIs): Carn Ingli and Waun Fawr (biological), and Cwm Dewi (geological). The Preseli transmitting station mast, erected in 1962, stands on Crugiau Dwy near the hamlet of Pentre Galar. To the south of Crugiau Dwy is the extensively quarried hill Carn Wen (Garnwen Quarry) which was still actively extracting igneous rock in 2018.

The Preselis have Special Area of Conservation status; the citation states that the area is "... exceptional in Wales for the combination of upland and lowland features..." Numerous scarce plant and insect species exist in the hills. For example, they are an important UK site for the rare Southern damselfly, Coenagrion mercuriale, where efforts to restore habitat were underway in 2015 and reported in 2020 to have been a success.

Communications and access
Two B-class roads, intersecting at New Inn, cross the hills: the B4313 NW-SE, reaching  and the B4329 NE-SW, reaching  at Bwlch-Gwynt (translation: windy gap). These, and a number of other minor roads and lanes, provide scenic routes popular with motoring, cycling and walking tourists. The A487 road skirts the western end of the range, near Newport. Cattle grids prevent egress of grazing stock from unenclosed areas of the hills.

The hills are popular with walkers wishing to follow prehistoric trails, with walks varying from easy to long-distance. The larger part of the hills is designated under the Countryside and Rights of Way Act 2000 as 'open country' thereby enabling walkers the 'freedom to roam' across unenclosed land, subject to certain restrictions. An east-west bridleway which runs the length of the main massif (known as Flemings' Way or the Golden Road), together with spurs to north and south, gives access to mountain bikers and horseriders. There are cycle trails. Paragliding is not permitted without the consent of the land owners, who in 2014 collectively agreed not to allow it.

Other features

Castell Henllys, on the A487 road between Eglwyswrw and Felindre Farchog is a reconstructed Iron Age settlement, illustrating what life may have been like in those times.

Prehistory
The Preselis are dotted with prehistoric remains, including evidence of Neolithic settlement. More were revealed in an aerial survey during the 2018 heatwave.

Samuel Lewis's A Topographical Dictionary of Wales published in 1833 said of Maenclochog parish:

Pollen analysis suggests that the hills were once forested but the forests had been cleared by the late Bronze Age.

Bluestones

In 1923 the petrologist Herbert Henry Thomas proposed that bluestone from the hills corresponded to that used to build the inner circle of Stonehenge, and later geologists suggested that  Carn Menyn (formerly called Carn Meini) was one of the bluestone sources. Recent geological work has shown this theory to be incorrect. It is now thought that the bluestones at Stonehenge and fragments of bluestone found in the Stonehenge "debitage" have come from multiple sources on the northern flanks of the hills, such as at Craig Rhos-y-felin. Advanced details of a recent contribution to the puzzle of the precise origin of the Stonehenge bluestones were published by the BBC in November 2013.

Others theorise that bluestone from the area was deposited  close to Stonehenge by glaciation. More detailed discussions on the bluestone topic can be found in the Stonehenge, Theories about Stonehenge and Carn Menyn articles.

Further investigations have pointed to a link between Waun Mawn (see below) and the Stonehenge bluestones.

Individual sites

The hills are rich in sacred and prehistoric sites, many of which are marked on Ordnance Survey maps. They include burial chambers, tumuli, hill forts, hut circles, stone circles, henges, standing stones and other prehistoric remains. These sites are spread across a number of communities that share parts of the Preseli range. In 2010, Dyfed Archaeological Trust carried out a comprehensive survey of historic sites in the Preseli Hills for Cadw. The Trust has produced extensive notes on the mountain range and surrounding features and villages.

Some of the more notable are: 
Bedd Arthur (Neolithic hengiform standing stones)
Mynydd Carningli (hillfort, SSSI)
Carn Menyn (chambered cairn)
Carreg Coetan Arthur (Neolithic dolmen)
Temple Druid (standing stone, cromlech)
Pentre Ifan (burial chamber)

Others include:
Banc Du (evidence of prehistoric settlement)
Carn Alw (Neolithic settlement)
Carn Goedog (bluestones and standing stone) 
Cerrig Lladron (Bronze Age stone row)
Foel Drygarn (hillfort)
Foel Cwmcerwyn (tumuli)
Frenni Fach & Frenni Fawr (tumuli - see also Blaenffos)
Glandy Cross (prehistoric remains)
Glyn Gath (tumulus)
Gors Fawr (stone circle) 
Mynyedd Melyn (hut circle) 
Parc-y-Meirw (standing stones) 
Rhos fach (standing stones) 
Tafarn y Bwlch (mountain pass and standing stones)
Tre-Fach (standing stone, prehistoric camp)
Ty-Meini (standing stone, known as "The Lady Stone")
Waun Mawn (standing stones; dismantled stone circle c.3400-3000 BC), grid reference

History
Slate quarrying was once an important industry in the Preseli Hills; the former quarries, worked for much of the 19th century, can still be seen in a number of locations such as Rosebush. Preseli slate was not of roofing quality, but its density made it ideal for machining for building and crafts. Most quarries had closed by the 1930s but there is a workshop at Llangolman where slate is still used to make a variety of craft items.

During the Second World War, the War Office used the Preseli Hills extensively for training exercises by British and American air and ground forces. Its proposed continued use after the war was the subject of a two-year ultimately successful protest by local leaders. The success of the protest was commemorated 60 years on, in 2009, with a plaque at the foot of Foel Drygarn near Mynachlog-ddu and another near the B4329 at Bwlch y Gwynt.

In 2000, Terry Breverton, a lecturer at Cardiff University, in promoting a book he had published, suggested that the rock star Elvis Presley's ancestors came from the Preseli Hills and may have had links to a chapel at St Elvis.

References

Further reading
 Downes, John. Field observations in the geology and geomorphology of the Preseli hills of north Pembrokeshire. Open University Geological Society Journal, Volume 32 (1–2) 2011, pp 17–21

External links

Geograph: photographs of the Preseli Hills and surrounding area
BBC Wales: local history
Experience Pembrokeshire: Mynydd Preseli
Visit Pembrokeshire: The Preseli Mountains

Mountain ranges of Wales
Landforms of Pembrokeshire
Sites of Special Scientific Interest in Pembrokeshire
Archaeological sites in Pembrokeshire